WIPX-LD, virtual channel 51 (UHF digital channel 34), is a low-powered Daystar owned-and-operated television station licensed to Indianapolis, Indiana, United States. The station is owned by Word of God Fellowship, parent company of the Daystar Television Network. WIPX-LD's transmitter is located on Walnut Drive in Indianapolis' northwest side. It is operated separately from full-power sister station WDTI (channel 69) in the city.

History
The station signed on on October 30, 1990, as W51BU. It was originally silent, then affiliated with ValueVision sometime.

In August 1998, W51BU was acquired DP Media and was converted into a translator of WIIB (channel 63) and were affiliates of Pax TV (now Ion Television). The low-power translator also changed its callsign to WIPX-LP to reflect its new affiliation. When DP merged with Paxson Communications in 2000, WIPX-TV/LP were Pax TV owned-and-operated stations (Paxson had earlier attempted to purchase WB affiliate WNDY-TV [channel 23, now a MyNetworkTV affiliate] for $28.4 million in 1997, before it was outbid by a $35 million offer from the Paramount Stations Group that October).

As a former translator of WIPX-TV
WIPX-LP formerly relayed WIPX-TV's signal to the northern portions of Indianapolis that received a Grade B to a non-existent signal of WIPX-TV (including Kokomo, Marion and Muncie), although there was significant overlap between the two stations' contours otherwise. WIPX-LP was a straight simulcast of WIPX-TV; on-air references to WIPX-LP were limited to Federal Communications Commission (FCC)-mandated hourly station identifications during programming.

Sale of WIPX-LP to Daystar
On December 15, 2014, Ion Media Networks reached a deal to donate WIPX-LP to Word of God Fellowship, parent company of the Daystar network.

On October 8, 2015, the station returned to the air as digital-only WIPX-LD.

References

Television stations in Indiana
Daystar (TV network) affiliates
Low-power television stations in the United States
Television channels and stations established in 1997
1997 establishments in Indiana